Doerfel is a lunar impact crater that is located in the vicinity of the southern pole, just on the far side of the Moon. It lies approximately midway between the large crater Hausen to the east-northeast and the even larger Zeeman to the southwest.

The outer wall of Doerfel retains much of its original form, but it has been rounded and slightly eroded by a history of subsequent bombardment. Many tiny craterlets lie on or near the rim, especially along the western edge. There is a slight outward extrusion in the southern rim, and the opposite, northern rim appears somewhat jumbled and eroded.

Doerfel's interior is also marked by several tiny craterlets in the otherwise relatively flat surface. There is a very slight central rise near the midpoint.

Satellite craters 

By convention these features are identified on lunar maps by placing the letter on the side of the crater midpoint that is closest to Doerfel.

References 

 
 
 
 
 
 
 
 
 
 
 
 

Impact craters on the Moon